Martin Suter (born 29 February 1948 in Zürich) is a Swiss author. He became known for his weekly column Business Class in the Weltwoche newspaper (1992–2004), now appearing in the Tages-Anzeiger, and another column appearing in "NZZ Folio". The columns have been published as nine books.

Suter has published fourteen novels, written four stage plays, and seven screenplays, for which he received various awards.

He is married and lives in Spain and Guatemala.

Suter worked previously as a copywriter and creative director in advertising before he decided to fully concentrate on his writing career in 1991. He achieved his break-through with his novel Small World in 1997, which was published by Diogenes Verlag.

Works
Small World, novel, 1997. Small World, transl. by Sandra Harper. London, Harvill, 2001, . (film : Small World)
Beresina oder Die letzten Tage der Schweiz (Beresina, or the Last Days of Switzerland, directed by Daniel Schmid), screenplay, 1999
Business Class, collected columns, 2000
Die dunkle Seite des Mondes (The Dark Side of the Moon), novel, 2000
Ein perfekter Freund (A Perfect Friend), novel, 2002
Lila, Lila (Violet, Violet), novel, 2004
Huber spannt aus (Huber relaxes), collected columns, 2005
Der Teufel von Mailand, novel, 2006. A Deal with the Devil, transl. by Peter Millar. London, Arcadia Books, 2007, .
Der letzte Weynfeldt, novel, 2008. The Last Weynfeldt, transl. by Steph Morris, New York, New Vessel Press, 2016, . 
Der Koch, novel, 2010. The Chef, transl. by Jamie Bulloch. London, Atlantic Books, 2013, .
Allmen und die Libellen,  novel, 2010, Allmen and the Dragonflies, transl. by Steph Morris, New York, New Vessel Press, 2018 .
Allmen und der rosa Diamant (Allmen and the Pink Diamond), novel, 2011
Abschalten, 2012
Die Zeit, Die Zeit, novel, 2012
Allmen und die Dahlien (Allmen and the Dahlias), novel, 2013
Allmen und die verschwundene María (Allmen and the Vanished Maria), novel, 2014
 Montecristo, novel, 2015. Montecristo, transl. by Jamie Bulloch. Harpenden (Herts), No Exit Press, 2016, .
Elefant, novel, 2017, Elefant, transl. by Jamie Bulloch, London, Fourth Estate, 2018 .
Allmen und die Erotik, novel, 2018
Allmen und der Koi, novel, 2019
Alle sind so ernst geworden (with Benjamin von Stuckrad-Barre), novel, 2020

References

External links

Swiss journalists
Swiss male novelists
1948 births
Living people
20th-century Swiss novelists
21st-century Swiss novelists
20th-century male writers
21st-century male writers